Bradwall is a small village and civil parish in the unitary authority of Cheshire East, about  northwest of Sandbach in the ceremonial county of Cheshire, England, and about  south of Manchester. According to the 2011 census, the population of the entire parish was 182. The area is predominantly agricultural, with no manufacturing or retail outlets.

The village is not mentioned in the 11th-century Domesday survey, but from the 13th century gained notability as the manorial estate of Richard de Bradwall and his successors, including the families of Venables, Berington and Oldfield. From the early 19th century, it became the seat of the Latham family of Bradwall who resided at Bradwall Hall until its demolition in the early 20th century.

Bradwall hosts social events at the Village Hall, horse trial competitions (eventing) at Manor farm, and coarse fishing at Field Farm Fisheries. The Wesleyan Chapel Methodist Church has been the only place of worship since 1882 and closed in September 2013. The manufacturer of Foden Trucks and their award-winning Fodens Motor Works Band, were based in Bradwall until a boundary change in 1936 placed them in the adjacent parish of Sandbach.

History

Place name
Bradwall is not mentioned in the Domesday Book, completed in 1086 for William I of England, at which time the area was thought to be uncultivated moorland between Brereton and Warmingham, that formed part of the southern boundary of the Barony of Kinderton, the historic name of Middlewich.

The township derives its name from the Old English word brāde, meaning broad, and wælla meaning spring. Variant spellings include (dates in brackets): Brade-, -wal, -wale, -walle, Bradwall (1226), Brad(e)well(e) (1281), Brod(e)wall (1324), Beatwall (1326), Broadwall (1415), Bardwell (1438), and, Bradwell (1724). The name was also associated with the local hamlet of Hollinsgreen, where it was referred to as Bradwall et Hollins (c. 1662), and Bradwall cum Hollins (1819). Today, the township also lends its name to the hamlet of Bradwall Green.

Archaeological finds
There is evidence of Bronze Age and Roman activity in the area. A Late Bronze Age axe head dating to around 1000-801 BC was found near Fields Farm Fisheries in Bradwall. Around a thousand Roman coins dating from not earlier than 270 AD were discovered in 1820, on the eastern side of Bradwall, a short distance from the Brindley Moor's Farm and about four miles direct from the Roman station at Kinderton, at a point where a small brook is crossed by the footpath from Brereton to Sandbach. Discovered by a mole-catcher, the coins included examples of denarii of Gallienus, Claudius II, Tetricus, Victorinus, and Diocletian. The remains of part of a Roman road, are also thought to have been discovered near the western side of Bradwall, by Boothlane, towards the west of Sandbach, and near King Street. Since the 1936 parish boundary changes, the road's location is now in Elworth on Roman Way in Sandbach Parish.

Manor of Bradwall 

The first records that mention Bradwall are from about the 13th century, when the Venables family of Kinderton divided the manorial estate (i.e. the land) of Bradwall into two parts or "moieties". Several families have been associated with either the Manor, or the more recent country seat at Bradwall Hall, including:

Seat of Bradwall

The country seat of Bradwall (i.e. its buildings and its estate) is thought to have been originally on the west side of the parish, within a rectangular moat with a large pool, with the name Hallfields, near Hollins Wood. Hall Field next to Hollins Wood is also found on 19th-century tithe maps. At some later time, the seat moved eastwards to Bradwall Hall.

Bradwall Hall
Located nearer the middle of the parish, Bradwall Hall was the seat of the Latham Family. Recorded as early as 1803, the Hall is described as "a large white house with no architectural features of interest, is said by Dr. George Ormerod to have been 'a large building of brick, finished with gables, at the end of an avenue of firs and evergreens,' which had been enlarged and modernised from time to time". Following the 19th-century decline of the English country house, Bradwall Hall was demolished on 16 October 1960, blown up by the 214 Field Squadron of the Royal Engineers, although one of its cottages and the coach-house remain, and they are now Grade II listed buildings, dated by English Heritage to the 17th century.

Bradwall Reformatory School for Boys

Bradwall Reformatory School was built by George William Latham (1827–1886) on his own property at Bradwall Hall, in 1855, and aimed to reform delinquent boys through the use of an industrial labour apprenticeship. A report to the House of Commons in 1861 reported that:

"There were 58 boys in the school when I inspected it. [...] I was glad to find that more of the ordinary farming processes were being resorted to; the plough and other common agricultural machines employed, so that the training of the lads as farm servants would be gradually made more complete than the use of spade labour allows of. The books are well kept. The punishments had been much fewer, chiefly fines or loss of privilege. [...] :The cost per head for the year was 18l. 9s. 11d."

Notable detainees included two eight-year-old boys, Peter Barratt and James Bradley, who on 11 April 1861 abducted and killed two-year-old George Burgess. They were charged with manslaughter, and sentenced by the judge Sir Charles Crompton to be sent to the Reformatory at Bradwall, which "was to rank as the most enlightened and successful institution of its kind in the country". Another detainee was one Joshua Tolley who was sent to Bradwall in 1871 at the age of eight. He was in and out of reform school until the age of 16, but as a persistent offender, served sentences in Knutsford and Dartmoor prisons.

George William Latham's cousin, Charles Latham (1816–1907) was surgeon to the Bradwall Reformatory from its foundation until his retirement in 1903. The school was renamed Bradwall Training School in 1908, and closed in 1920. The buildings are now Grade II listed, converted into cottages.

Economic history 
Historically, Bradwall has been farming and pasture land with the majority of people working in agriculture. The 1881 Census notes that nearly 20% of the residents were in agriculture followed by nearly 12% in domestic service; 43% had an unknown, or non-specific occupation (see table below). The 1902 Kelly's Directory of Cheshire, noted that in Bradwall, "the crops are oats, roots, wheat and rye. The land is chiefly pasture", and that commercially, there are a total of 15 farmers, one blacksmith and the superintendent of the Reformatory School.

Geography

Bradwall is a village and parish council in southeast Cheshire in the northwest of England.

Wooded areas included Barlow Wood, Bradwall Wood, Denman Wood and Hollins Wood.

A handful of brooks flow throughout the parish, the most notable being the so-called Small Brook which flows into Sanderson's Brook in the adjacent Sproston Parish. The Environment Agency indicates that the Small Brook may be subject to occasional, but not extensive flooding.

Bradwall parish also includes the hamlets of Bradwall Green in the east, and Hollinsgreen in the west, which used to be called Hollins, and Bradwall-cum-Hollins, that was noted for a 16th-century water-powered corn mill. There also used to be a hamlet called Hope in the parish. (Not to be confused with Bradwell in the Derbyshire parish of Hope.)

Climate
Following the rest of United Kingdom and its parent county, Cheshire, Bradwall has an oceanic climate influenced by the Atlantic Ocean, and also by its altitude due to its proximity to the Pennines.

See also: Average temperature chart, Precipitation chart, and Wind speed chart

Geology

Bradwall sits mainly on fine-grained mudstone, over a bedrock of Wilkesley Halite member with Halite-stone. The halite is responsible for rock salt deposits in the surrounding area (see "Salt in Cheshire"), and there is evidence of there having been "wich fields" along the western side of Wards Lane that may indicate small scale brine extraction. The thickness of the bedrock is estimated at around 400 m, and was formed around 221 to 227 million years ago in the Late Triassic Carnian period, in a hot dry environment. It is surrounded by Devensian glacial till from the last glacial period from between approximately 110,000 and 10,000 years ago. A small pocket of undifferentiated river terrace deposits of sand and gravel, dating from the Quaternary about 2.5 million years old, is located southeast of the intersection of Pillar Box Lane with Bradwall Road. (See illustration at The British Geological Survey). The topsoil reveals many trace elements, and an acidity that has been decreasing since 1978. Several boreholes in the area reveal glacial sand and clays with a couple of layers of ground water.

Seismology
One of the six major regional seismic profiles lines, the  Lancaster to Birmingham profiles passes directly through Bradwall, as part of the Sandbach-Knutsford Sub-Basin of the Cheshire Basin. About five other minor seismic profiles also pass through Bradwall, all managed by the UK Onshore Geophysical Library, that are uses by resources exploration companies (such as oil, gas and coal). Bradwall does not lie in an earthquake zone, although on 11 November 1997, a rare magnitude 1.5 earthquake was recorded about  due north in Byley.

Demographics

According to the 2011 census, the population of Bradwall Civil Parish totals 182 people (93 men and 89 women) in 67 households. All households described their ethnicity as white, and of the population of 182, 141 (77%) people stated their religion as Christian, 28 (15%) as no religion, the remaining 13 (7%) not stating a preference. The life expectancy at birth in 2007–2009 is 79 years for men, and 82 for women.

Population
The population of Bradwall peaked in the 1920s at over 1300. The sharp decline in population in the 1930s is due to the 1936 change in the parish boundaries, when the populated area of Elworth was moved from Bradwall Parish and into Sandbach Parish. Since the 1950s, there has been a slight decline in population, and it is now well under 200:

1801, 1831.
1811.
1841–1851.
1861–1871.
1881–1961
2001
2011

Economy 

There are only around a dozen businesses operating in Bradwall today, half of which are farms split evenly between dairy and agricultural farming. Other businesses include property development, accountancy and gardening. Some of the farms also operate secondary businesses, notably riding schools, stables and an annual eventing event.

Compared to the 1881 Census (see Economic History), the working population recorded in the 2001 Census seems to show that the economy of Bradwall, along with the population, in decline.

The 2001 census notes that of the total population of 166, that 127 (77%) are of working age between 16 and 74. Of these, 90 (54%) are employed, divided between 36 people in "Extractive and Manufacturing Industries" and 54 people in "Service Industries". The Census also reveals the following occupational breakdown:

Culture and community

Bradwall Village Hall
Bradwall Village Hall was opened on 26 October 1972 by Lady Diana Helen Barlow, (wife of Sir John), on land of the former Bradwall Hall. The hall is used for social and public events, such as Cheshire Rural Touring Arts, the South Cheshire Cheshire Beekeepers' Association, Sandbach Folk Dance Club, and the Probus Club of Sandbach. The Village Hall is also used as the local Polling Station.

Sport
Although it has a Sandbach postcode, coarse fishing is available in the southeast of Bradwall Civil Parish at Field Farm Fisheries with five pools stocked with barbel, bream, carp, chub, crucian, rudd, roach and tench. The equestrian governing body, British Eventing, holds horse trials in eventing at Manor Farm each year. Plum Tree Farm Riding Centre is the local riding school. Chellebeech Livery Yard is at Springbank Farm.

Parks and nature reserves
Bradwall Parish has no parks and nature reserves of its own.

Landmarks

Bradwall is home to three buildings that were Grade II listed from 5 December 1986, though none are open to the public:

The 17th-century cottage and coach-house of the former Bradwall Hall includes a two-story building with three windows, made with brown brickwork and tile roof. Inside are chamfered oak beams, chimney corner (inglenook) and oak supporting beams (bressumer). The coach house is also oak framed with brown brick and roof tiles.

Built around 1700, Plumbtree Farmhouse off Ward's Lane in Bradwall Green is a two-storey building with three windows, built with brown brick.

The Reformatory School and Cottages (1855 datestone) on Walnut Lane, is a two-storey building with three windows, now converted in cottages, that surrounds a rectangular courtyard. The school originally cost £255 to build.

Transport

Roads

The main road through Bradwall is Bradwall Road, which runs from Middlewich in the northwest, to Sandbach in the South. A  stretch of the M6 motorway passes through the east of the parish, which is a couple of miles from the M6 Exit 17. Before the motorway was built in the 1960s, and still available to local traffic, Bradwall is served by the A54 Middlewich to Holmes Chapel road to the north, the A50 Holmes Chapel to Arclid in the east, the A534 Arclid to Sandbach to the south, and the A533 Sandbach to Middlewich in the west.

Walking
There are several public footpaths forming rights of way in Bradwall. For example, a  footpath runs from Congleton Road in Sandbach, northwards through the fields and across the Small Brook to Bradwall Manor, and another  footpath runs from the end of Vicarage Lane in Elworth, northeastwards across the Small Brook, Wood Lane to Bradwall Lane near the junction of Pillar Box Lane.

Nearby transport
A few miles north of Bradwall, RAF Cranage was built during the Second World War, and was operational between 1940 and 1958.

There are no bus services into Bradwall. There nearest services are a couple of miles away in Sandbach, where the No.32 goes to Crewe, 37(E) to Middlewich, 38 to Macclesfield and Crewe, 49 to Holmes Chapel, 78 to Nantwich, 319 to Holmes Chapel, D1 to Crewe, H1 to Whitehill, X81 to Middlewich, X22 to Liverpool, and X38 to Congleton.

Built in 1841, the Crewe to Manchester railway Line passes through Bradwall from southwest to northeast. Closing to passengers in 1960, a single freight line between Sandbach via Middlewich railway station and Northwich also just enters Bradwall in the northwest, near the electricity substation in Moston. The closest railway junction is Crewe railway station, serving Chester, Derby, London, Manchester and beyond.

Governance
Bradwall civil parish was originally part of Sandbach Ancient Parish, and was created a separate parish from it in 1867. It also was part of Nantwich Hundred, Congleton Poor Law Union, Rural Sanitary District, and (after 1866) it formed part of Congleton Rural District until 1974, when it became part of the Borough of Congleton.

In terms of parliamentary representation, the Bradwall area (including the time when it was not a separate civil parish) was in the Cheshire Southern Division from 1832 to 1867; in the Cheshire Mid Division, from 1867 to 1885; in the Eddisbury Division, from 1885 to 1918; in the Northwich Division, from 1918 to 1948; from 1948 it was in Knutsford County Constituency, but it is currently in Congleton Parliament Constituency, represented by Mrs Fiona Bruce MP. The local polling station is Bradwall Village Hall.

One of 112 Local Councils in Cheshire East, Bradwall Parish Council is currently chaired by Greg Gnyp.

Education

There are no schools in Bradwall parish, so it falls into the Offley and Sandbach School Admission Catchment areas, which determines the nearest appropriate school. A 2011 OFSTED report noted that this is a larger-than-average-sized school, whose overall effectiveness was graded as "good", an improvement by one grade over the previous inspection in 2008. The secondary schools are Sandbach High School and Sixth Form College for girls, and Sandbach School for the boys. Both are independent schools that have converted to academy status. 2008 OFSTED reports gave each school a top Grade 1 "Outstanding" rating. The local Voluntary Aided (Catholic) school is St Mary's Catholic Primary School in Middlewich, which a 2011 Ofsted reports noted as "Satisfactory", and the local Voluntary Aided (C of E) school is Brereton Church of England Primary School, which a 2011 Ofsted report stated as "Good". The nearest college is South Cheshire College, and the nearest university is Manchester Metropolitan University's Institute of Education, both in Crewe.

Religious sites

Built in 1882, Bradwall's only place of worship is the Wesleyan Chapel Methodist Church on Ward's Lane. The church is one of four in the Sandbach Mission Area (the others are in Sandbach, Sandbach Heath and Wheelock), and services are held fortnightly on Sunday. The minister is the Rev'd Kim Stilwell. Historic Minutes, financial and administrative records between 1882 and 1928 are held at the Cheshire Record Office. In 1982, the Chapel celebrated its centenary.

St Mary's Church in Sandbach has a chancel that belonged to Bradwall Hall, and includes the arms of Oldfield. Once called the Bradwall Chancel or Bradwall Chapel, it is not called the Chapter House, "Church records state that Philip Oldfield of Bradwall had a confirmation of his right to this chapel from the Bishop of Chester on 8 October 1589.

Notable people
Edwin Foden, (1841–1911), was a vehicle manufacturer who founded Foden Trucks and Fodens Motor Works Band. He died at his home, Elworth House, then in Bradwall parish. Other members of the family business included his sons, William Foden (1868–1964) and Edwin Richard Foden (1870–1950), who were born at Bradwall Green, and Foden senior's business partner, George Hancock (c. 1823), who was a neighbour on Foundry Street, Bradwall in 1871.

Services
Public utilities to Bradwall Parish County are served by Scottish Power Manweb regional electricity company, the North West gas network (a gas pipeline passes through Bradwall along the route of the M6 motorway,) and water is provided by Severn Trent Water.

There is no cable TV available in the area, but like the rest of country, Sky TV is available by satellite.

The local telephone exchange is Sandbach (code WMSBH), with several companies providing a variety of Internet broadband services, including Broadband ADSL since 2000, and Broadband ADSL Max since 2006 (estimated speed 3.5Mb). Mobile phone services with 2G and 3G are available from the major networks. A 15m UTMS mobile phone mast operated by 3 is on Brindley Lane, and a  GSM mast operated by Network Rail on Wood Lane.

Bradwall is policed by Middlewich and Holmes Chapel Neighbourhood Policing Team, part of Cheshire Constabulary police force. Crime rates are low, with just two crimes reported throughout 2011.

See also

Listed buildings in Bradwall
Nearby towns and villages: Arclid, Brereton, Congleton, Crewe, Elworth, Kinderton, Middlewich, Sandbach and Wheelock

Further reading
John Parsons Earwaker, The History of the Ancient Parish of Sandbach, "Bradwall Township" (1890) Co. Chester including the two chapelries of Holmes Chapel and Goostrey from original records.
F. A. Youngs, Guide to the Local Administrative Units of England. Volume I: Northern England (1991) London: Royal Historical Society. .
"Reformatory Work at Bradwall", Cheshire Observer, Saturday, 11 February 1893; p. 5; Issue 2114.

Notes

References

Bibliography

External links
Bradwall CP (Parish), Office for National Statistics, Neighbourhood Statistics
Bradwall Population, Housing and Industry, 1801–2001, at A Vision of Britain Through Time website
Bradwall Tithe and historic OS Maps at Cheshire Archives and Local Studies

Villages in Cheshire
Civil parishes in Cheshire